Purna Bahadur Gharti Magar is a Nepalese politician, belonging to the Communist Party of Nepal (Maoist Centre) currently serving as the member of the 2nd Federal Parliament of Nepal. In the 2022 Nepalese general election, he won the election from Eastern Rukum 1 (constituency).

References

Living people
Nepal MPs 2022–present
Members of the Provincial Assembly of Lumbini Province
1967 births